Alon Sasson (born 30 July 1986) is an Israeli former judoka.

As part of the Israel national judo team, Sasson won the 2005 European Team Judo Championships. He is the older brother of the two-time Israeli Olympic medalist and former judoka Or "Ori" Sasson.

References

External links
 
 

1986 births
Living people
Israeli male judoka
Jewish martial artists
Jewish Israeli sportspeople
Israeli male athletes
Israeli Jews
European Games competitors for Israel
Judoka at the 2015 European Games
21st-century Israeli people